Victoriaville Airport  is located near the town of Victoriaville, Quebec, Canada.

Activity
Victoriaville Airport is used by private airplanes. Cascades's Piaggio Avantis are based in Victoriaville. A Beech King Air B100 is used under the company CoopAir, by a few business in the Victoriaville area. The école de parachutisme de Victoriaville uses a Cessna 205 and a Piper Navajo PA31 for skydiving from May to October. A flight school operates a Cessna 172 and a Cessna 150.

References

Transport in Victoriaville
Registered aerodromes in Centre-du-Québec